This is a list of notable players who have played for Dundee United Football Club. Dundee United were founded as Dundee Hibernian in 1909 but were renamed in 1923. The club made their début in the Northern League in 1909 and joined the Scottish Football League for the first time a year later.

List of players
The following list includes all Dundee United players that have played 100 or more competitive matches for the club in any first-class competition, e.g., national leagues (Scottish Football League, Scottish Premier League, Scottish Professional Football League), Scottish Cup, League Cup or any European competition such as the European Cup, UEFA Cup Winners' Cup, Inter-Cities Fairs Cup and UEFA Europa League.

Players are listed with their first-team début and last appearance for the club, along with appearances and goals. Statistics are correct as of 27 September 2014 and are taken from where further details are available.

Notes

External links
 Comprehensive player history

Players
 
Dundee United
Players
Association football player non-biographical articles